The Serra da Ibiapaba Environmental Protection Area is an environmental protection area in the states of Piauí and Ceará, Brazil.
It contains fragments of cerrado, caatinga and Atlantic Forest, and is home to the endangered red-handed howler.

Location

In Piauí it covers all or part of the municipalities of Bom Princípio do Piauí, Brasileira, Buriti dos Lopes, Cocal, Domingos Mourão, Lagoa de São Francisco, Pedro II, Piracuruca, Piripiri, Batalha, Buriti dos Montes, Caraúbas do Piauí, Caxingó, Cocal dos Alves, Juazeiro do Piauí, Luís Correia, Milton Brandão, São João da Fronteira, São José do Divino and Sigefredo Pacheco.
In Ceará it covers all or part of the municipalities of Chaval, Granja, Moraújo, Tianguá, Viçosa do Ceará and Uruoca.

The APA adjoins the Delta do Parnaíba Environmental Protection Area to the north.
It surrounds the Sete Cidades National Park, and adjoins the Ubajara National Park to the east.

History

It aims to guarantee conservation of remnants of Cerrado and Caatinga in around the Sete Cidades National Park, and also the seasonal forest, open rainforest and transitional forests.
The park is classed IUCN protected area category V (protected landscape / seascape.

The consultative council was created by ordinance 105 of 8 October 2012 to contribute to creation and implementation of the APA's management plan.
This was an important step in implementing and managing the APA, and was followed by meetings and workshops with representatives of civil society and government entities.
The APA is administered by the Chico Mendes Institute for Biodiversity Conservation (ICMBio).

Environment

Via Rural places the APA in the caatinga biome and the ecotone between caatinga and Amazon rainforest.
The APA contains remnants of cerrado and caatinga trees around the Sete Cidades National Park, and open and transitional seasonal rainforest in the mountains of the region.
Endangered species that are protected in the APA include the red-handed howler (Alouatta belzebul) and the frog Adelophryne baturitensis.

Most of the population of the APA are rural families engaged in agriculture as their main economic activity.
Threats include indiscriminate burning and deforestation, predatory hunting, illegal trade in wild animals, poor management of water resources, indiscriminate use of pesticides and misuse of the soil.
The consultative council wants to promote ecotourism and handicrafts, and sustainable activities such as agroforestry, agroecology and beekeeping, and to  replace large and medium-sized animals and poultry.

Notes

Sources

Environmental protection areas of Brazil
Protected areas established in 1996
1996 establishments in Brazil
Protected areas of Ceará
Protected areas of Piauí